The London Plan is the statutory spatial development strategy for the Greater London area in the United Kingdom that is written by the Mayor of London and published by the Greater London Authority.

The regional planning document was first published in final form on 10 February 2004. In addition to minor alterations, it was substantially revised and republished in February 2008 and again in July 2011. In October 2013, minor alterations were made to the plan to comply with the National Planning Policy Framework and other changes in national policy.

The London Plan of March 2016 was published, and amended, in January 2017. The current plan has a formal end-date of 2036.

As of March 2021, a new London Plan was adopted by the Greater London Authority, planning for the next 20-25 years.

Mandate
The plan replaced the previous strategic planning guidance for London issued by the Secretary of State and known as RPG3 . It is a requirement of the Greater London Authority Act 1999 that the document is produced and that it deals only with matters that are of strategic importance to Greater London. The Act also requires that the London Plan includes in its scope:

the health of Londoners,
equality of opportunity,
contribution to sustainable development in the United Kingdom.

Objectives
The plan is a spatial development strategy for the Greater London area and has six objectives. The current objectives, as adopted by the 2011 and 2016 revisions, are to ensure that London is:

The objectives were previously updated in 2008 following the Greater London Authority Act 2007:

The original 2004 objectives were:

Policies

The 2016 plan had chapters:

Opportunity areas
The plan identifies dozens of areas of opportunity, which are where the bulk of efforts will be concentrated, with an aim at reducing social deprivation and creating sustainable development. The opportunity areas will be able to accommodate around 5,000 jobs each or about 2,500 homes, or a mixture of the two. The opportunity areas will mostly be town centres as opposed to suburban developments in the boroughs, although those are mentioned as important in terms of job growth and quality of life. By definition, an Opportunity Area is brownfield land with significant capacity for development. This contrasts with an Intensification Area that can be developed to higher than existing densities with more modest economic change.

Sub-regions

For the purposes of the plan, London is divided into five sub-regions. From 2004 to 2008 the sub-regions were initially the same as the Learning and Skills Council areas established in 1999. Within this scheme there was a separate Central sub-region and four others around it. The London part of the Thames Gateway zone was entirely contained within the East London sub-region. The 2004–08 sub-regions each had a Sub-Regional Development Framework.

The sub-regions were revised in February 2008 as part of the Further Alterations to the London Plan. These sub-regions each radiated from the centre to combine inner and outer London boroughs. The 2008–11 sub-regions, each had its own Sub Regional Implementation Framework.

In 2011 the sub-regions were revised again. A smaller Central sub-region was reintroduced, the South sub-region was reintroduced, and all boroughs in the Thames Gateway were returned to the East sub-region. The 2011 sub-regions are maintained in the 2016 London Plan.

Throughout these revisions has been a separately defined Central Activities Zone which includes areas with a very high concentration of metropolitan activities.

Activity centres

The London Plan identifies 201 activity centres in the city. All activity centres are categorised into:

2 international centres, the West End and Knightsbridge. 
14 metropolitan centres such as Hounslow, Bromley, Ealing, Stratford and Wood Green
36 major centres such as Brixton, Dalston, Eltham and Kilburn
149 district centres such as Camberwell, West Hampstead and Whitechapel.

Smaller local and neighbourhood centres are also referred to in the plan but are not listed.

Alterations
There have been a number of amendments to the London Plan which have been incorporated into the current version that was published in February 2008. Early alterations were made covering housing provision targets, waste and minerals. Further alterations to the plan covered climate change; London as a world city; The London Economy; Housing; Tackling social exclusion; Transport; London's geography, the sub-regions and inter-regions; Outer London; Liveability (including safety, security and open spaces); and the 2012 Olympic Games and Paralympic Games. The mayor gained new statutory powers following the Greater London Authority Act 2007.

Following the 2008 change of mayor, a new review was initiated in July 2008 and a new London Plan published in July 2011. As of this date, modifications are made to fully comply with the National Planning Policy Framework.

In 2013, London Mayor Boris Johnson proposed early minor alterations to the London Plan that were aimed at preventing boroughs from setting rent caps or targets for affordable rented homes in their local development frameworks. The alterations were approved in a vote by the London Assembly in September 2013.

Alterations made since July 2011 were consolidated in the London Plan of March 2016, which was published and amended in January 2017.

Following the 2016 change of mayor, London Mayor Sadiq Khan outlined proposals towards creating a new London Plan. A draft version was published in December 2017, with the final version of the latest London Plan released in March 2021, and formally coming into effect on 2nd March 2021.

References

External links
The London Plan on the Greater London Authority's Web site
Outer London Commission – established by Mayor "to advise how Outer London can play its full part in the city's economic success" (2009)

 
Local government in London
United Kingdom planning policy
Regional planning in London
2004 in London
2009 in London
Government documents of the United Kingdom
2011 in London
City plans